Daniel Czapliński was a deputy starosta of Chyhyryn and a rotmistrz in the forces of the Polish–Lithuanian Commonwealth. He is best known as a personal foe of Bohdan Khmelnytsky with whom he got into a dispute over property (and possibly Khmelnytsky's wife, Helena Czaplińska, the so-called "Helen of the steppe"). This is sometimes seen as one of the main trigger of the Khmelnytsky Uprising.

In 1649, during the uprising, he took part in the defense of Zbarazh (1649) and the Battle of Berestechko (1651). In 1653 he was elected as the deputy to the Crown Tribunal from Lublin.

He was portrayed by Henryk Sienkiewicz in With Fire and Sword (Ogniem i mieczem). In the movie adaptation of the novel he was played by Jerzy Bończak.

Military personnel of the Polish–Lithuanian Commonwealth